is a 2020 Japanese animated romantic drama film based on a manga of the same name written and illustrated by Natsuki Kizu. The film is directed by Hikaru Yamaguchi, written by Yuniko Ayana, and produced by Lerche. The film was released in Japan on August 22, 2020.

Adapting the second story arc of the manga, the film takes place after the events of the anime series, focusing on the relationship between Haruki and Akihiko.

The film was licensed by Crunchyroll, and was streamed on its website on February 2, 2021.

Synopsis
As Mafuyu attempts to write a new song for the upcoming festival, he learns about the complicated relationship between Akihiko and his ex-boyfriend, Ugetsu. Meanwhile, Haruki harbors unrequited feelings for Akihiko.

Voice cast
Shōgo Yano as Mafuyu Satō
Yuma Uchida as Ritsuka Uenoyama
Masatomo Nakazawa as Haruki Nakayama
Takuya Eguchi as Akihiko Kaji
Shintarō Asanuma as Ugetsu Murata

Production
In September 2019, it was announced that a sequel anime film of Given anime television series was in the works by adapting the second story arc of the manga. The key staff and cast members reprised their respective roles for the film. Fuji TV's new boys' love (yaoi) anime label, Blue Lynx handled the development of the film. The key staff, including director Hikaru Yamaguchi expressed their gratitude for the film.

Release
The film was scheduled to release in theaters in Japan on May 16 2020, but was postponed to August 22, 2020, due to COVID-19 pandemic. Crunchyroll acquired the international distribution rights for the film, and streamed on its website on February 2, 2021. In Southeast Asia, WeTV released the film on May 25, 2021.

Reception

Box office
The film opened at number 9 out of top 10 in the Japanese box office in its opening weekend, and later dropped off from the charts in its second weekend.

Critical reception
Kim Morrisy of Anime News Network gave the film a solid "B" rating, and stated "Overall, I will say that I was satisfied with this continuation, even if I didn't like it quite as much as the original series".

References

External links
 

2020s Japanese films
2020 anime films
Anime films based on manga
Japanese LGBT-related films
Films postponed due to the COVID-19 pandemic
Lerche (studio)
LGBT-related animated films
Noitamina
Yaoi anime and manga